Crossing the Line is a science fiction novel by British writer Karen Traviss, published in November 2004. It is the second book of the Wess'Har Series. Its predecessor was called City of Pearl, published in February of the same year.  Some of the main characters include Shan Frankland, hardened copper now infected with c'naatat; Aras, the lonely Wess'har, outcast by his horrible disease; Eddie Michallat, journalist who finds himself in a position to affect history; and Lindsay Neville, the Marines Commander trying to deal with the loss of her newborn son David, and bent on revenge on Shan.

Plot summary
The book concerns the struggle of Shan Frankland, a police officer in the year 2376, to cope with biological changes that have been made to her body by an alien species.

References

Wess'Har series
2004 novels
HarperCollins books